Montell Cozart (born August 11, 1995) is an American football quarterback for the Houston Gamblers of the United States Football League (USFL). He attended Bishop Miege High School in Overland Park, Kansas, and played college football for the Kansas Jayhawks and the Boise State Broncos. He played for the Calgary Stampeders of the Canadian Football League (CFL) from 2018 to 2020.

Early life and college career
Cozart earned first-team all-state honors after leading Bishop Miege High School to the Kansas Class 5A State Championship game in 2012. Cozart threw for 2,759 yards and 25 touchdowns as a senior at Bishop Miege High School, where he was coached by Jon Holmes.

Rated as a 3-star quarterback by Rivals.com, Cozart chose to attend the University of Kansas and join its football program over offers from Indiana, Kansas State, Minnesota, Northern Illinois and West Virginia. At Kansas, Cozart suffered a season-ending injury four games into his junior year; the NCAA granted Cozart an extra year of eligibility due to his injury. Cozart saw the most action in his fourth year with the Jayhawks, completing 112 of 190 pass attempts for 1,075 yards with 7 touchdowns and 9 interceptions. On February 21, 2017, Cozart announced he was leaving Kansas to seek a graduate transfer and would be eligible during the 2017 season. Cozart announced on May 4, 2017, that he will join the Boise State Broncos football team.

Professional career

Calgary Stampeders 
Montell signed with the Calgary Stampeders of the Canadian Football League (CFL) on August 14, 2018. Cozart dressed for 21 games over his first two years in the league as a third string quarterback, winning the 106th Grey Cup as a rookie. His lone statistic over this time was a single pass completion for 11 yards. After signing a one-year extension for 2020, the CFL season was subsequently cancelled due to the COVID-19 pandemic and Cozart was not re-signed and became a free agent.

Birmingham Stallions 
On April 22, 2022, he signed with the Birmingham Stallions of the United States Football League. He was transferred to the inactive roster on May 6, 2022.

Houston Gamblers 
He was traded to the Houston Gamblers on December 31, 2022.

References

External links
 Kansas Jayhawks bio

1995 births
Living people
American football quarterbacks
Kansas Jayhawks football players
Players of American football from Kansas City, Missouri
Players of Canadian football from Kansas City, Missouri
Boise State Broncos football players
Bishop Miege High School alumni
Canadian football quarterbacks
Calgary Stampeders players
Birmingham Stallions (2022) players
Houston Gamblers (2022) players